Suzanna Son (born October 31, 1995) is an American film actress, musician, former adult film actress, and model known for the role of Strawberry in Red Rocket. She has been nominated for a Gotham Award and an Independent Spirit Award.

Early life and education 
Son was born in Hamilton, Montana but grew up in Washington state. She attended Cornish College of the Arts in Seattle where she majored in classical music before changing her major to musical theatre. She ultimately dropped out during her second year.

Career 
In 2018, Son was approached by director Sean Baker outside a screening of Gus Van Sant's Don't Worry, He Won't Get Far on Foot at the Arclight Hollywood Cinema. Baker asked her to audition for his upcoming film but did not call her back for  two years.  The film, Red Rocket was released in 2021 and featured Son in the lead role as a 17-year old girl in South Texas who gets into a relationship with a former porn star. The film was her first feature role; prior to Red Rocket, Son had appeared in a "risque" low-budget short film.  Son was nominated for a Gotham Award for Best Breakthrough Performer and an Independent Spirit Award for Best Supporting Actress for the role. 

Son has also released several music recording, chiefly though uploads to her YouTube channel.  When Baker discovered that she taught piano, he wrote a scene for her to sing a slow ballad cover version of the NSYNC song "Bye Bye Bye". Son also performed an original song in case they were unable to secure the rights to the song, but all five members of NSYNC approved of the cover. Son's version was released on various music streaming services to promote the film.

In November 2021 Son joined the cast of the HBO music-industry drama series The Idol opposite The Weeknd and Lily-Rose Depp. On April 27, 2022, Deadline reported that she was one of the cast members not expected to return after a forced hiatus, due to a change in the show's creative directions. On August 21, Son appeared in the official teaser trailer. On March 1, 2023, Rolling Stone reported that Son remained in the cast despite the overhaul. The series is set to premiere in 2023.

References

External links 
 
 Official Youtube channel

Living people
21st-century American actresses
Actresses from Montana
American film actresses
Actresses from Washington (state)
Cornish College of the Arts alumni
1995 births